This list comprises all players who have participated in at least one league match for Orange County Blues FC since the team's first season in the United Soccer League (USL Pro) in 2011. Players who were on the roster but never played a first team game are not listed; players who appeared for the team in other competitions (US Open Cup, etc.) but never actually made a USL appearance are noted at the bottom of the page where appropriate.

A
  Amir Abedzadeh
  Leon Abravanel
  Artur Aghasyan
  Nelson Akwari
  David Arvizu

B
  Yeniel Bermúdez
  Chad Bond
  Carlos Borja
  Gerardo Bravo
  Jhonny Bravo
  Bryan Burke
  Ladislas Bushiri
  Peter Byers

C
  Cho Sun-Hyung
  Chukwudi Chijindu
  Tomislav Colic

D
  Shahryar Dastan
  Oscar Dautt
  George Davis IV
  Ramiro Zurdo Diaz
  Adriano de Lima
  Bright Dike
  Cameron Dunn

F
  Brian Farber
  Matthew Fondy

G
  Walter Gaitán
  Maykel Galindo
  Erlys García
  Irving Garcia
  Luis Gonzalez
  Leonard Griffin
  Maxwell Griffin

H
  Matheau Hall

J
  Ebrima Jatta
  Andrew Jean-Baptiste

M
  Cory Miller
  Edwin Miranda
  José Miranda
  Mehrshad Momeni

P
  Park Cheun-Yong
  Akeem Priestley

R
  Mike Randolph
  Cesar Rivera
  Allan Russell

S
  Dane Saintus
  Israel Sesay
  Shay Spitz
  Josh Suggs

T
  Josh Tudela

W
  Ricky Waddell
  Carl Woszczynski

Y
  Dariush Yazdani

External links
 2011 Los Angeles Blues stats
 2012 Los Angeles Blues stats

Los Angeles Blues
 
Association football player non-biographical articles